During 2001, tropical cyclones formed in seven different areas called basins, located within various parts of the Atlantic, Pacific and Indian Oceans. The deadliest tropical cyclone of the year was Lingling in the West Pacific which caused 379 fatalities in total as it struck the Philippines and Vietnam, while the costliest storm of the year was Michelle, with a damage cost of around $2.43 billion as it catastrophically affected the Greater Antilles and the Bahamas in late October. So far, 23 Category 3 tropical cyclones formed, including two Category 5 tropical cyclones formed in the year.

Global atmospheric and hydrological conditions
La Niña is a weather pattern that occurs every few years, as a result of complex variations on the ocean temperatures in the equatorial band of the Pacific Ocean. The 1998–2001 La Niña persisted through early 2001, which made the waters of Pacific Ocean, and the Atlantic Ocean warmer than normal.

Summary

Systems

January

February

March

April

May

June

July

August

September

October

November

December

Global effects
There are a total of 9 tropical cyclone basins, 7 are seasonal and two are non-seasonal, thus all 7 basins except the Mediterranean and South Atlantic are active. In this table, data from all these basins are added.

See also

 Tropical cyclones by year
 List of earthquakes in 2001
 Tornadoes of 2001

Notes
2 Only systems that formed either on or after January 1, 2001 are counted in the seasonal totals.
3 Only systems that formed either before or on December 31, 2001 are counted in the seasonal totals.4 The wind speeds for this tropical cyclone/basin are based on the IMD Scale which uses 3-minute sustained winds.
5 The wind speeds for this tropical cyclone/basin are based on the Saffir Simpson Scale which uses 1-minute sustained winds.
6The wind speeds for this tropical cyclone are based on Météo-France which uses wind gusts.

Notes

References

External links

Regional Specialized Meteorological Centers
 US National Hurricane Center – North Atlantic, Eastern Pacific
 Central Pacific Hurricane Center – Central Pacific
 Japan Meteorological Agency – NW Pacific
 India Meteorological Department – Bay of Bengal and the Arabian Sea
 Météo-France – La Reunion – South Indian Ocean from 30°E to 90°E
 Fiji Meteorological Service – South Pacific west of 160°E, north of 25° S

Tropical Cyclone Warning Centers
 Meteorology, Climatology, and Geophysical Agency of Indonesia – South Indian Ocean from 90°E to 141°E, generally north of 10°S
 Australian Bureau of Meteorology (TCWC's Perth, Darwin & Brisbane) – South Indian Ocean & South Pacific Ocean from 90°E to 160°E, generally south of 10°S
 Papua New Guinea National Weather Service – South Pacific Ocean from 141°E to 160°E, generally north of 10°S
 Meteorological Service of New Zealand Limited – South Pacific west of 160°E, south of 25°S

Tropical cyclones by year
2001 Atlantic hurricane season
2001 Pacific hurricane season
2001 Pacific typhoon season
2001 North Indian Ocean cyclone season
2000–01 Australian region cyclone season
2001–02 Australian region cyclone season
2000–01 South Pacific cyclone season
2001–02 South Pacific cyclone season
2000–01 South-West Indian Ocean cyclone season
2001–02 South-West Indian Ocean cyclone season
2001-related lists